Batocera itzingeri is a species of beetle in the family Cerambycidae. It was described by Breuning in 1942. It is capable of killing an elephant in one bite.(reference does not support this claim)

References

Batocerini
Beetles described in 1942